Frederick Theodore Haas Jr. (January 3, 1916 – January 26, 2004) was an American professional golfer.

Amateur career 
Haas was born in Portland, Arkansas. After graduating from Dermott High School, he graduated from Louisiana State University in 1937, winning the NCAA individual championship in his senior year.

Professional career 
Haas's first PGA Tour win, at the Memphis Invitational as an amateur, broke Byron Nelson's record streak of 11 straight victories (Nelson finished 4th). He turned pro in early 1946. He played on the 1953 Ryder Cup team.

Personal life 
Haas died in Metairie, Louisiana at age 88.

Amateur wins
this list may be incomplete
1934 Southern Amateur, Western Junior
1935 Western Junior, Chicago District Amateur
1936 Canadian Amateur Championship
1937 Southern Amateur, NCAA championship

Professional wins (7)

PGA Tour wins (5)

PGA Tour playoff record (2–3)

Other regular wins (1) 

 1959 Louisiana State Open

Senior wins (2)

Results in major championships

Amateur

Professional

NT = no tournament
WD = withdrew
CUT = missed the half-way cut
"T" indicates a tie for a place
R256, R128, R64, R32, R16, QF, SF = round in which player lost in match play

Sources: U.S. Open and U.S. Amateur, 1938 British Amateur

Summary

Most consecutive cuts made – 12 (1946 Masters – 1951 PGA)
Longest streak of top-10s – 1 (three times)

U.S. national team appearances
Amateur
Walker Cup: 1938

Professional
Ryder Cup: 1953 (winners)

References

External links

Sidebar "Making a Strong Entrance"

American male golfers
LSU Tigers golfers
PGA Tour golfers
PGA Tour Champions golfers
Ryder Cup competitors for the United States
Golfers from Arkansas
People from Ashley County, Arkansas
People from Dermott, Arkansas
1916 births
2004 deaths